Craig Kellman (born September 28, 1971) is an American animator, character designer and director. He is best known for his work on Madagascar (2005), Hotel Transylvania (2012), Cloudy with a Chance of Meatballs 2 (2013), Trolls (2016), The Powerpuff Girls and Samurai Jack.

Background 
Kellman attended the California Institute of the Arts as a part of their character animation program. At 18, he started work in animation on Bobby's World. He would go on to produce and direct The Twisted Tales of Felix the Cat at 23 and work on major animated series, such as Dexter's Laboratory, The Powerpuff Girls, Foster's Home for Imaginary Friends and HBO's The Ricky Gervais Show.

Awards and nominations 
Kellman has received multiple awards and nominations for his works in animation. He has been nominated twice for an Emmy, winning one 2017 for "Outstanding Individual Achievement in Animation" for episode "XCII" of Samurai Jack. Kellman also won an Annie Award for "Outstanding Achievement for Character Design in an Animated Television/Broadcast Production" for his work on the episode "XCVI", as well as one for " Outstanding Achievement in Character Design in an Animated TV/Broadcast Production" for Elf: Buddy's Musical Christmas in 2016.

Filmography

References

External links 

Craig Kellman on IMDb
Craig Kellman on Linkedin

Living people
1971 births
American animators
California Institute of the Arts alumni
Place of birth missing (living people)
American illustrators
American male voice actors
American voice directors
DreamWorks Animation people
Sony Pictures Animation people
Warner Bros. Animation people
Pixar people
Cartoon Network Studios people
Hanna-Barbera people
Nickelodeon Animation Studio people
Annie Award winners